Janaki Ramudu is a 1988 Indian Telugu-language film directed by K. Raghavendra Rao and produced by K. Murari under Yuva Chitra Arts. The film stars Nagarjuna, Vijayashanti and Jeevitha, with music composed by K. V. Mahadevan. It was dubbed into Tamil as Idhaya Devathai. The film was influenced by Mooga Manasulu (1964).

Plot 
The story deals with an eternal love story between Ramu (Nagarjuna) and Janaki (Vijayashanthi) in two different time lines. The film begins with a current timeline where Ramudu and Janaki are modern lovers who happen to visit a village. They start getting reminded of their past lives by reaching the place. The story drifts back to their past life where Lakshmi is a villager who is passionate about dance, music, and Ranga teaches her how to sing. Due to some hardships in their village and economical differences, they die in sad circumstances. With their love being immortal, they are reborn in the current era. The rest of the story is about whether in the current era, Ramu and Janaki unite.

Cast 

 Nagarjuna as Ramu / Ranga
 Vijayashanti as Janaki / Lakshmi
 Jeevitha as Abaddala Satyavathi
 Satyanarayana as Ramu's Father
 Jaggayya as Raghavayah
 Mohan Babu as Balavantha Rao
 Pradeep Shakthi as Bhupathi
 Chalapathi Rao as Kathula Narasimha Bhupathi
 Brahmanandam as Rangam Singaraju
 Sakshi Rangarao as Satyavathi's Father
 Suthivelu as Hanumanthu
 Bhimeswara Rao as Doctor
 Vankayala Satyanayana as Priest
 Chidatala Appa Rao as Sambo Siva Shankar Sastry
 Shubha as Annapurnamma
 Kakinada Syamala as Durgamma
 Chandrika as Mangala
 Sri Lakshmi as Balavantha Rao's Keep
 Kalpana Rai as Principal

Soundtrack 

Music composed by K. V. Mahadevan. Music released on LEO Audio Company.

Awards
S. Janaki won Nandi Award for Best Female Playback Singer for the song "Nee Charana Kamalam Mrudulam"

References

External links 
 

1988 films
1980s Telugu-language films
Films directed by K. Raghavendra Rao
Films scored by K. V. Mahadevan
Films about reincarnation